Joshua Keith Palmer (born September 22, 1999) is a Canadian-born American football wide receiver for the Los Angeles Chargers of the National Football League (NFL). He played college football at Tennessee and was drafted by the Chargers in the third round of the 2021 NFL Draft.

Early life and high school
Palmer grew up in Brampton, Ontario, the son of Keith and Alethia Palmer. He has two sisters, Lanisha and Keiana. He initially attended St. Roch Catholic Secondary School, where he played basketball and ran track in addition to playing football. He was named St Roch’s junior athlete of the year in tenth grade.  He played WR and DB helping St Roch win two JV football titles in ninth and tenth grade.  He also played for the Burlington Stampeders of the Ontario Football Conference and the Brampton Bulldogs. After participating in summer football camps in the United States and receiving interest from several Division I football programs, Palmer transferred to St. Thomas Aquinas High School in Fort Lauderdale, Florida for his final two years of high school. Palmer was rated a three star recruit and initially committed to play college football at Syracuse during the summer before his senior year. He finished his senior season with 32 receptions for 506 yards with eight touchdowns and was named second-team Class 7A All-State. Palmer de-committed from Syracuse and opted to sign to play at Tennessee.

College career
Palmer played in all 12 of the Volunteers' games as a freshman, catching nine passes for 98 yards. He became a starter as a sophomore and finished the season with 23 receptions for 484 yards and two touchdowns and also rushed for one touchdown. Palmer caught 34 passes for 457 yards and one touchdown as a junior. He finished his senior season, which was shortened to nine games due to COVID-19, with 33 receptions for 475 yards and four touchdowns.

Collegiate statistics

Professional career

Palmer was selected by the Los Angeles Chargers in the third round (77th overall) of the 2021 NFL Draft. Though eligible and ranked as the #1 Canadian prospect, he was not selected in the subsequent 2021 CFL Draft. Palmer signed his four-year rookie contract with the Chargers on July 23, 2021.

2021
Palmer had one catch for 17 yards in his NFL debut in Week 1 against the Washington Football Team. In Week 8, Palmer recorded his first career touchdown on a 24-yard reception from Justin Herbert in a 27-24 loss to the New England Patriots. Overall, in his rookie season, Palmer appeared in all 17 games, of which he started five. Palmer finished the 2021 season with 33 receptions for 353 receiving yards and four receiving touchdowns.

2022
In Week 9 against the Atlanta Falcons, Palmer had eight receptions for 106 receiving yards in the 20–17 victory. Two weeks later, against the Kansas City Chiefs, he had eight receptions for 106 receiving yards and two receiving touchdowns in the 30–27 loss. On the 2022 season, Palmer appeared in 16 games, of which he started 11. He finished with 72 receptions for 769 receiving yards and three receiving touchdowns.

References

External links

Los Angeles Chargers bio
Tennessee Volunteers bio

1999 births
Living people
Canadian people of Jamaican descent
Canadian players of American football
Sportspeople from Brampton
Palmer, Josh
American football wide receivers
Tennessee Volunteers football players
Los Angeles Chargers players